Bhim Singh Thapa (sometimes known as Bagh Bhimsen Thapa) was Nepalese Umrao (equivalent to a commander) who was active during the Unification of Nepal.

Bhim Singh Thapa was also known by the title of Bagh (meaning: Tiger).

His son Amar Singh Thapa is known as one of the national heroes of Nepal.

He died in 1759 at the Battle of Palanchok.

References 

1759 deaths
Bagale Thapa
Nepalese military personnel
People from Gorkha District
People of the Nepalese unification
Nepalese military personnel killed in action
Nepalese Hindus